Callandoon is a rural locality in the Goondiwindi Region, Queensland, Australia. It is on the border of Queensland and New South Wales.

Geography 
The Macintyre River forms the southern boundary of the locality which is also part of the border between Queensland and New South Wales.

History
Callandoon pastoral station was established in the mid 1840s by the prominent colonial capitalist and New South Wales politician Augustus Morris. Strong Aboriginal resistance to the British occupancy of their lands in the area induced Morris and other prominent landholders such as William Wentworth to organise a Native Police force to crush the indigenous recalcitrance. Frederick Walker was the first Commandant of this force and through violent and coercive measures, he was able to place the area under British control by 1850. Callandoon became the headquarters of the Native Police until 1853.

Callendoon Provisional School opened on 1893 and closed on 1893, operating for only a few months.

References 

Goondiwindi Region
Localities in Queensland